Geraldine Ann Davies (born 13 May 1946) is an English former cricketer who played primarily as a right-handed batter. She appeared in five One Day Internationals for Young England at the 1973 World Cup. She played domestic cricket for Surrey.

References

External links
 
 

1946 births
Living people
Sportspeople from Reading, Berkshire
Young England women cricketers
Surrey women cricketers